The Mosque in Sendling, Munich, Germany, is situated on Schanzenbachstraße. The mosque has existed there since 1989 as an Islamic prayer house mainly for Turkish Muslims.

Name and organisation 
The official Turkish name of the mosque is Diyanet İşleri Türk İslam Merkezi, or "German Turkish-Islamic Center for the Institute for Religion". This is shortened to DITIM, and is also designated to the mosque association, to which 42 members and their families belong. The association is linked to the federation Diyanet İşleri Türk İslam Birliği (DITIB), and stands under the supervision of the Turkish president for Religious Affairs Diyanet İşleri Bakanlığı.

DITIB also selects the imam of the mosque, who usually speaks little German and is a civil servant of the Turkish state.

DITIB also operates two other mosques in Munich, in Passing, and Allach. The Schanzenbachstraße Mosque is the biggest of the three mosques in Munich, and is laid out for approximately 130 visitors. This has proved in practice untenable, as at peak times, up to 700 visitors come to pray.

Plan to build a new mosque 
For that reason, DITIB submitted 2004 plans for a change to the building, which has caused resistance among people living near the building. Therefore, DITIB worked with the city of Munich to help find a suitable place for a new building, at Gotzinger Place. However, those new building plans were also attacked, and the press have covered the arguments since spring 2005, under the title Sendlinger Mosque Controversy.

See also 
Islam in Germany
List of mosques in Europe

References

External links

The New York Times, "In Munich, Provocation in a Symbol of Foreign Faith", December 8, 2006

Buildings and structures in Munich
Sendling
Mosque-related controversies in Europe
Religious buildings and structures in Bavaria
Proposed buildings and structures in Germany
Proposed mosques
Religion in Munich
DITIB mosque